Gözecik can refer to:

 Gözecik, Kovancılar
 Gözecik, Mengen